A mora knife is a small sheath knife. It is a fixed blade knife, with or without a finger guard. The term originates from knives manufactured by the cutleries in Mora, Dalarna. In Sweden and Finland, Mora knives are extensively used in construction and in industry as general-purpose tools. Mora knives are also used by all Scandinavian armies as an everyday knife.

Types  

Mora knives were mostly produced by the KJ Eriksson and Frosts Knivfabrik (Frost's Knife Factory) companies; they merged their brands under Mora of Sweden, later renamed Morakniv, but a number of other knife-makers also make mora-style knives. The Morakniv company uses blades of 12C27 stainless steel, UHB-20C carbon steel, Triflex steel, or very hard (HRC 61) carbon steel laminated between softer alloyed steel.

Other manufacturers of mora-type knives are Cocraft a house brand of Clas Ohlson, Best Tools and Hultafors.

Some models

Morakniv 
 Mora Companion MG High Carbon (replacement of the now discontinued 840 Clipper)
 Mora Companion MG Stainless (replacement of the now discontinued 860 Clipper)
 Mora Basic 511 carbon
 Mora Basic 546 stainless
 Mora Bushcraft Series
 Mora Kansbol
 Mora Garberg
 Mora Outdoor 2000

See also
Swiss Army knife
Opinel
EKA (knives)
Mercator K55K

References

Further reading

External links 
  Morakniv AB
 Hultafors

Knives
Swedish culture
Knife